Union Township is a township in Harrison County, in the U.S. state of Missouri.

The township was named for the federal union, since a large share of the residents were pro-Union during the Civil War.

References

Townships in Missouri
Townships in Harrison County, Missouri